Kanhaiyalal Maneklal Munshi (30 December 1887 – 8 February 1971), popularly known by his pen name Ghanshyam Vyas, was an Indian independence movement activist, politician, writer and educationist from Gujarat state. A lawyer by profession, he later turned to author and politician. He is a well-known name in Gujarati literature. He founded Bharatiya Vidya Bhavan, an educational trust, in 1938.

Munshi wrote his works in three languages namely Gujarati, English and Hindi. Before independence of India, Munshi was part of Indian National Congress and after independence, he joined Swatantra Party. Munshi held several important posts like member of Constituent Assembly of India, minister of agriculture and food of India, and governor of Uttar Pradesh. In his later life, he was one of the founding members of Vishva Hindu Parishad.

Early life
Munshi was born on 30 December 1887 at Bharuch, a town in Gujarat State of British India. Munshi took admission at Baroda College in 1902 and scored first class with 'Ambalal Sakarlal Paritoshik'. In 1907, by scoring maximum marks in the English language, he received 'Elite prize' along with degree of Bachelor of Arts. Later, he was given honoris causa from same university. He received degree of LLB in Mumbai in 1910 and registered as lawyer in the Bombay High Court.

One of his professor at Baroda College was Aurobindo Ghosh (later Sri Aurobindo) who had a profound impression on him. Munshi was also influenced by Maharaja Sayajirao Gaekwad III of Baroda, Mahatma Gandhi, Sardar Patel and Bhulabhai Desai.

Political career

Indian independence movement 
Due to influence of Aurobindo, Munshi leaned towards revolutionary group and get himself involved into the process of bomb-making. But after settling in the Mumbai, he joined Indian Home Rule movement and became secretary in 1915. In 1917, he became secretary of Bombay presidency association. In 1920, he attended annual congress session at Ahmedabad and was influenced by its president Surendranath Banerjee.

In 1927, he was elected to the Bombay legislative assembly but after Bardoli satyagraha, he resigned under the influence of Mahatma Gandhi. He participated in the civil disobedience movement in 1930 and was arrested for six months initially. After taking part in the second part of same movement, he was arrested again and spent two years in the jail in 1932. In 1934, he became secretary of Congress parliamentary board.

Munshi was elected again in the 1937 Bombay presidency election and became Home Minister of the Bombay Presidency. During his tenure of home minister, he suppressed the communal riots in Bombay. Munshi was again arrested after he took part in Individual satyagraha in 1940.

As the demand for Pakistan gathered momentum, he gave up non-violence and supported the idea of a civil war to compel the Muslims to give up their demand. He believed that the future of Hindus and Muslims lay in unity in an "Akhand Hindustan". He left Congress in 1941 due to dissents with Congress, but was invited back in 1946 by Mahatma Gandhi.

Offices held 
 Member of Bombay Legislative Assembly
 Member of Working committee of Indian National Congress (1930), Member of All India Congress Committee (1930-36,1947)
 Secretary of Congress Parliamentary Board (1934)
 Home Minister of Government of Bombay (1937-40)

Post-independence India

He was a part of several committees including Drafting Committee, Advisory Committee, Sub-Committee on Fundamental Rights. Munshi presented his draft on Fundamental Rights to the Drafting  and it sought for progressive rights to be made a part of Fundamental Rights.

After the independence of India, Munshi, Sardar Patel and N. V. Gadgil visited the Junagadh State to stabilise the state with help of the Indian Army. In Junagadh, Patel declared the reconstruction of the historically important Somnath temple. Patel died before the reconstruction was completed. Munshi became the main driving force behind the renovation of the Somnath temple even after Jawaharlal Nehru's opposition.

Munshi was appointed diplomatic envoy and trade agent (Agent-General) to the princely state of Hyderabad, where he served until its accession to India in 1948. Munshi was on the ad hoc Flag Committee that selected the Flag of India in August 1947, and on the committee which drafted the Constitution of India under the chairmanship of B. R. Ambedkar.

Besides being a politician and educator, Munshi was also an environmentalist. He initiated the Van Mahotsav in 1950, when he was Union Minister of Food and Agriculture, to increase area under forest cover. Since then Van Mahotsav a week-long festival of tree plantation is organised every year in the month of July all across the country and lakhs of trees are planted.

Munshi served as the Governor of Uttar Pradesh from 1952 to 1957. In 1959, Munshi separated from the Nehru-dominated (socialist) Congress Party and started the Akhand Hindustan movement. He believed in a strong opposition, so along with Chakravarti Rajagopalachari, he founded the Swatantra Party, which was right-wing in its politics, pro-business, pro-free market economy and private property rights. The party enjoyed considerable success and eventually died out.

In August 1964, he chaired the meeting for the founding of the Hindu nationalist organisation Vishva Hindu Parishad at Sandipini ashram.

Posts held 
 Member of constituent assembly of India and its drafting committee (1947-52)
 Union minister of food and agriculture (1950-52)
 Agent general to the Government of India, Hyderabad (1948)

Academic career 
Munshi was thinking of giving an institutional foundations to his ideas and ideals since 1923. On 7 November 1938, he established Bharatiya Vidya Bhavan with Harshidbhai Divatia and his wife Lilavati Munshi at Andheri, Bombay. Later, he established Mumbadevi Sanskrit Mahavidyalaya to teach Sanskrit and ancient Hindu texts according to traditional methods.

Apart from founding Bharatiya Vidya Bhavan, Munshi was instrumental in the establishment of Bhavan's College, Hansraj Morarji Public School, Rajhans Vidyalaya, Rajhans Balvatika and Panchgani Hindu School (1922). He was elected Fellow of the University of Bombay, where he was responsible for giving adequate representation to regional languages. He was also instrumental in starting the department of Chemical Technology.

He served as Chairman of Institute of Agriculture, Anand (1951-71), trustee of the Birla Education Trust (1948-71), executive chairman of Indian Law Institute (1957-60) and chairman of Sanskrit Vishwa Parishad (1951-1961).

Literary career and works 
Munshi, with pen name Ghanshyam Vyas, was a prolific writer in Gujarati and English, earning a reputation as one of Gujarat's greatest literary figures. Being a writer and a conscientious journalist, Munshi started a Gujarati monthly called Bhargava. He was joint-editor of Young India and in 1954, started the Bhavan's Journal which is published by the Bharatiya Vidya Bhavan to this day.

Munshi was also a litterateur with a wide range of interests. He is well known for his historical novels in Gujarati, especially his trilogy Patan-ni-Prabhuta (The Glory of Patan), Gujarat-no-Nath (The Lord and Master of Gujarat) and Rajadhiraj (The King of Kings). His other works include Jay Somnath (on Somnath temple), Krishnavatara (on Lord Krishna), Bhagavan Parasurama (on Parshurama), and Tapasvini (The Lure of Power) a novel with a fictional parallel drawn from the Freedom Movement of India under Mahatma Gandhi. Munshi also wrote several notable works in English.

Munshi has written mostly based on fictional historical themes namely

 Earlier Aryan settlements in India (What he calls Gaurang's – white skinned)
 Krishna's endeavors in Mahabharata times
 More recently in 10th century India around Gujarat, Malwa and Southern India.

K.M. Munshi's novel Prithivivallabh was made into a movie of the same name twice. The adaptation directed by Manilal Joshi in 1924 was very controversial in its day: The second version was by Sohrab Modi in 1943.

Works in Gujarati and Hindi
His works are as following:

Novels
 Mari Kamala (1912)
 Verni Vasulat (1913) (under the pen name Ghanashyam)
 Patanni Prabhuta (1916)
 Gujaratno Nath (1917)
 Rajadhiraj (1918)
 Prithivivallabh (1921)
 Svapnadishta (1924)
 Lopamudra (1930)
 Jay Somanth (1940)
 Bhagavan Parashurama (1946)
 Tapasvini (1957)
 Krishnavatara (in eight volumes) (1970)last novel, still remained incomplete
 Kono vank
 Lomaharshini
 Bhagvan Kautilya
 Pratirodha (1900)
 Atta ke svapana (1900)
 Gaurava kā pratīka (1900)
 Gujarat ke Gaurava (1900)
 Sishu aura Sakhi (1961)
 Avibhakta Atma
Drama
 Brahmacharyashram (1931)
 Dr. Madhurika (1936)
 Pauranik Natako
Non-fiction
 Ketlak Lekho (1926)
 Adadhe Raste (1943)

Works in English

 Gujarat and Its Literature
 Imperial Gujaras
 Bhagavad Gita and Modern Life
 Creative Art of Life
 To Badrinath
 Saga of Indian Sculpture
 The End of An Era
 President under Indian Constitution
 Warnings of History: Trends in Modern India
 Somanatha, The shrine eternal

Personal life 
In 1900, he married Atilakshmi Pathak, who died in 1924. In 1926, he married Lilavati Munshi (née Sheth).

Popular culture

Munshi was portrayed by K. K. Raina in the Shyam Benegal's mini-series Samvidhaan.

Memorials
 A major thoroughfare in Mumbai is named after him.
 A road in Jaipur is named after him.
 A school in Thiruvananthapuram is named after him as Bhavan's Kulapati K.M. Munshi Memorial Vidya Mandir Sapthat.
 A postage stamp was issued in his honor in 1988.
 The Bharatiya Vidya Bhavan has instituted an award in his honor – The Kulapati Munshi Award – awarded to recognize and honor a citizen of the Kendra who has done excellent and outstanding service to society in any special field.
 A boys hostel named as K. M. Munshi Hall at Main campus, The Maharaja Sayajirao University of Baroda, Vadodara, Gujarat.

References

Further reading

External links
 
 
 

1887 births
1971 deaths
People from Vadodara
Indian independence activists from Gujarat
Scholars from Gujarat
Governors of Uttar Pradesh
Gujarati-language writers
Founders of Indian schools and colleges
University and college founders
Members of the Constituent Assembly of India
Novelists from Gujarat
Bharatiya Vidya Bhavan
Members of the Central Legislative Assembly of India
English-language writers from India
Indian male dramatists and playwrights
20th-century Indian lawyers
Hindi-language writers
Gandhians
Indian male journalists
Indian Hindus
Prisoners and detainees of British India
Swatantra Party politicians
20th-century Indian politicians
Indian environmentalists
Indian National Congress politicians from Gujarat
Hindu activists
Hindu movements
20th-century Indian novelists
20th-century Indian educators
Indian historical novelists
20th-century Indian dramatists and playwrights
Indian male novelists
Dramatists and playwrights from Gujarat
Maharaja Sayajirao University of Baroda alumni